John Hunt Thursfield (16 June 1892 – 26 April 1951) was an English first-class cricketer who played in three matches for Worcestershire in the 1920s. His debut was against Warwickshire at Edgbaston in May 1922 when he scored 35 in the first innings and took a catch to dismiss Freddie Calthorpe.
He was awarded an MC in the Great War, on 3 June 1916.

Notes

2. Wisden on the Great War:the lives of cricket's fallen 1914-1918.

References
John Thursfield from CricketArchive

English cricketers
Worcestershire cricketers
1892 births
1951 deaths